Laubierina is a genus of sea snails, marine gastropod mollusks in the family Laubierinidae.

Species
 Laubierina peregrinator Warén & Bouchet, 1990

References

External links
  Warén, A.; Bouchet, P. (1990). Laubierinidae and Pisanianurinae (Ranellidae), two new deep-sea taxa of the Tonnoidea (Gastropoda: Prosobranchia). Veliger. 33(1): 56-102

Laubierinidae